Brothers in Arms: Double Time is a first-person shooter video game compilation for the Wii and OS X platforms. The title is a compilation of the first two Brothers in Arms games, Brothers in Arms: Road to Hill 30 and Brothers in Arms: Earned in Blood, and was developed by Gearbox Software and published by Ubisoft. It features 31 levels set during the Battle of Normandy.

The Wii version of the game uses the motion sensing abilities of the Wiimote and the Nunchuk attachment for issuing battle gestures and squad commands during gameplay. It lacks any multiplayer features.

The OS X version of Brothers in Arms: Double Time was released on April 16, 2010, by Feral Interactive.

Reception 

Brothers in Arms: Double Time received "generally unfavorable" reviews according to review aggregator Metacritic.

References

External links 
Brothers in Arms: Double Time official website

2008 video games
Brothers in Arms (video game series)
First-person shooters
Multiplayer and single-player video games
MacOS games
Ubisoft games
Unreal Engine games
Video game compilations
Wii games
Feral Interactive games
Gearbox Software games
Video games developed in the United States
Video games set in France